More Family Time is an album by Jamaican musician Ziggy Marley, released in 2020 and featuring numerous special guests including Alanis Morissette,  Busta Rhymes, Sheryl Crow, Lisa Loeb, Tom Morello, and Ben Harper.

A portion of the proceeds from More Family Time will be given to Marley's 501(c)3 URGE.

Production

Due to the COVID-19 pandemic in the United States, Marley found himself preoccupied with family issues and homelife which led to writing a follow-up to his 2009 children's album Family Time. Marley recorded the album in his home studio and then reached out to friends to add to the tracks.

The album featured Marley's family and was inspired by many of their activities.

One song, "My Dog Romero", is about the family dog, a lagotto Romagnolo, adopted shortly before the pandemic began.

Track listing
All songs written and produced by Ziggy Marley, except where noted.

Reviews
Rolling Stone gave the album 3/5 stars and called it "an ideal time filler for parents looking for something/anything to put on the stereo and get your kids shaking out the sillies between bouts of remote learning."

References

2020 albums
Children's music albums
Ziggy Marley albums